Pavel Ivanovich Lebedev-Polianskii (Russian: Па́вел Ива́нович Ле́бедев-Поля́нский;  21 December 1881 – 4 April 1948) was a Bolshevik revolutionary and later a prominent Soviet state functionary, literary scholar and academic.

Biography 
Born Pavel Ivanovich Lebedev in Melenki, Vladimir Oblast he became active in the Bolshevik faction of the Russian Social Democratic Labour Party in 1902. In 1908, he eloped with Vera Lebedeva and then went into exile in Geneva where they stayed until returning to Russia in 1917. In 1914, he reconstituted Vpered arguing that the reason so many European socialists supported the First World War indicated that socialist ideology was weak - something which could be addressed by scientific and socialist education. He also used the pseudonym Valerian Polianskii.

He joined the Bolsheviks in August 1917. 

From 1917 to 1919, he was commissar of the Main Administration of Literature and Publishing department of the People's Commissariat for Education, where he organised new editions of works of classic Russian literature. From 1918 to 1920, he was chairman of the All-Russian Council of Proletkult during which time he edited Proletarskaya Kul'tura with Fedor Kalinin.

In 1921, he became director of Glavlit, a post he held until 1930. From 1928 to 1930, he edited Literatura i marksizm (Literature and Marxism). He was also a member of the editorial board of the first edition of the Great Soviet Encyclopedia.

From 1934 to 1939, he edited Literaturnaia entsiklopediia (Literary Encyclopedia). 

From 1937 until his death in 1948, Lebedev-Polianskii was the director of the Institute of Russian Literature (Pushkin House) of the Academy of Sciences. He led campaigns to erase non-Marxist literary studies and linguistics in the USSR and to establish the principle of partisanship in Soviet science and ideology.  

He was awarded the Order of Lenin in 1945.

Works 
He published a number of books:
 Lenin and Literature, (1924)
 Three Great Russian Democrats, (1938)

References

1881 births
1948 deaths
Russian revolutionaries
Old Bolsheviks
Russian male essayists
Russian Social Democratic Labour Party members
Soviet literary critics
Russian literary critics
Full Members of the USSR Academy of Sciences
Soviet literary historians
Soviet male writers
20th-century Russian male writers
20th-century essayists
Censorship in the Soviet Union
Journal of the Ministry of Education editors